Overhaul may refer to:

The process of overhauling, see
Maintenance, repair, and overhaul
Refueling and overhaul (eg. nuclear-powered ships)
Time between overhaul
Overhaul (firefighting), the process of searching for hidden fire extension on a fire scene
Overhaul (My Hero Academia), a character in the manga series My Hero Academia

See also
Overall (disambiguation)
Overhaulin', a TV show